Hylton George Hylton Jolliffe, 3rd Baron Hylton (10 November 1862 – 26 May 1945) was a British peer and Conservative politician.

Hylton was the eldest son of Hedworth Jolliffe, 2nd Baron Hylton, and Lady Agnes Mary Byng. Henry Paget, 1st Marquess of Anglesey was his maternal great-grandfather.

Career
George succeeded the barony in 1899; prior to that he was educated at Eton college and Oriel College, Oxford. He pursued a brief military career as capital for the Somerset imperial yeomanry, then diplomatic service in 1888, then 3rd secretary in 1890 and 2nd secretary in 1894. He became Justice of the peace and county Alderman for Somerset where he sat in politics.

Hylton entered the Diplomatic Service in 1888, but in 1895 he was elected to the House of Commons for Wells. He held this seat until 1899, when he succeeded his father as third Baron Hylton and entered the House of Lords. In June 1915 Hylton was appointed a Lord-in-waiting (government whip in the House of Lords) in the newly formed coalition government, and in 1918 he was promoted him to Captain of the Yeomen of the Guard. The coalition government of David Lloyd George fell in 1922, but Hylton continued as Deputy Chief Whip also under Bonar Law and Stanley Baldwin. However, after the first Baldwin government fell in January 1924, he never returned to office.

He was created Viscount Hylton and owned much of Chaldon, of which he was Lord of the manor.

Lord Hylton married Lady Alice Adeliza Hervey, daughter of Frederick Hervey, 3rd Marquess of Bristol, in 1896. He died in May 1945, aged 82, and was succeeded in his titles by his son William George Hervey Jolliffe. Lady Hylton died in 1962.

References

Sources

External links 

Hylton, George Jolliffe, 3rd Baron
Hylton, George Jolliffe, 3rd Baron
Hylton, Hylton Jolliffe, 3rd Baron
Hylton, George Jolliffe, 3rd Baron
Conservative Party (UK) MPs for English constituencies
Hylton
UK MPs 1895–1900
Hylton, B3
Eldest sons of British hereditary barons